Mt. Atlas is a historic home and national historic district located near Haymarket, Virginia, United States. It was built about 1795 and is a -story, three-bay, Georgian style, frame dwelling with a single-pile, side hall plan. It has a -story rear ell dated to the late-19th century and a two bay front porch. The house features a single exterior stone chimney, a metal gable roof, and a molded, boxed cornice with modillions.  Also included in the district are a smokehouse and the sites of the former kitchen and a carriage house.

It was added to the National Register of Historic Places in 1989.

References

External links
Mount Atlas, State Route 731 vicinity, Waterfall, Prince William County, VA: 3 photos, 3 data pages, and 1 photo caption page at Historic American Buildings Survey

Georgian architecture in Virginia
Historic American Buildings Survey in Virginia
Historic districts on the National Register of Historic Places in Virginia
Houses completed in 1795
Houses in Prince William County, Virginia
Houses on the National Register of Historic Places in Virginia
National Register of Historic Places in Prince William County, Virginia
Neoclassical architecture in Virginia
Victorian architecture in Virginia